SurfControl Plc., was a British software company based in Cheshire, England. The company provided website filtering, e-mail filtering and desktop security software for both enterprise and home users.

SurfControl was acquired by Websense on 3 October 2007. The purchase price was approximately £204 million ($416 million), including deferred compensation and stock option expense. Websense plans to continue the SurfControl business until at least 2011. On 2 April 2008, Websense sold CyberPatrol, the SurfControl parental control software product, to newly formed Internet safety software company CyberPatrol, LLC. According to Websense's quarterly report, they received $1.4 million in cash from the sale of CyberPatrol assets.

Prior to being acquired by Websense, SurfControl acquired a British cloud computing company called BlackSpider Technologies Limited in July 2006 for £19.5m in cash.

Product range

The current product range is called the Enterprise Protection Suite, and includes products for website and e-mail filtering and user security.

The key feature of the SurfControl filtering software is the ability to categorize websites and then allow or restrict users access by selecting categories.

Examples of the categories are:

 Adult/Sexually Explicit
 Advertisements & Popups
 Personals & Dating
 Proxies & Translators
 Intolerance & Hate

SurfControl also license their URL database and categorization engine to other companies such as Check Point for use in their products and appliances.

References

External links
SurfControl's Official Website

Content-control software
Companies formerly listed on the London Stock Exchange